The 46th edition of the World Allround Speed Skating Championships for Women took place on 9 and 10 February 1985 in Sarajevo, Yugoslavia at the Zetra Ice Rink.

Title holder was Karin Enke from East Germany.

Distance medalists

Classification

 * = Fall

Source:

References

Attribution
In Dutch

1980s in speed skating
1980s in women's speed skating
1985 World Allround
1985 in women's speed skating